Aird (Gaelic:An Àird) is a village in Dumfries and Galloway, in the southwest of Scotland.

References

Villages in Dumfries and Galloway